"Pure" is the twelfth episode and final episode of the first season of Hulu's horror anthology streaming television series Into the Dark. The feature-length episode was directed by Hannah Macpherson, who also wrote the episode's teleplay. It was released on Hulu on September 6, 2019.

Plot
Shay is attending a purity ball with her father Kyle and her rebellious half-sister Jo. She knows neither person very well, as she only met them after the death of her mother two months prior. Jo is dismissive of the retreat, seeing it as patriarchal, antiquated nonsense, while Shay hopes to use it to grow closer to her dad. At the retreat, Shay and the other girls listen to sermons by conservative Pastor Seth about Lilith, who he portrays as lusty and sinful due to being created equal, and Eve, who he depicts as symbolic of women's weakness.

Later that night Shay is included in a ritual to summon Lilith, which Jo secretly holds every year with her cabin mates. This year's ritual appears successful and Shay starts experiencing strange phenomena, prompting her to investigate the ritual. She discovers that it would be successful as long as one of the participants wasn't a virgin and that the ritual would culminate with Lilith possessing the woman's body. Shay also finds that she strongly disagrees with the retreat's ideals and methods, telling her cabin mates, one of whom is Seth's daughter Lacey, that they should exert control over their own bodies and sexuality. Jo decides to lose her virginity to her boyfriend, only to be caught and captured by her father and Seth.

At the purity ball the following day, a distraught-driven Jo admits to a worried Shay that Kyle had known about her since birth, but deliberately chose to exclude her until now. She'd kept this secret due to wanting her father's approval. This angers Shay and when Seth tries to gather everyone to sign a purity contract, Shay refuses. She confesses to lying about her virginity for Kyle's approval, but that she's not ashamed of her sexuality.

Other girls stand up to their fathers and Lacey admits to not upholding her father's commands before shooting herself with a gun Seth carried, unable to live with the torture he put her through and her conflicting emotions. Lilith enters the body of a pleading Shay and uses her powers to control and then kill the men before setting the retreat on fire, stating that she's watched women suffer for long enough. The girls' bodies are shown huddled on the floor before a scene shows them walking away to the woods, led by Lilith.

Cast
 Jahkara Smith as Shay 
 McKaley Miller as Jo
 Ciara Bravo as Lacey
 Annalisa Cochrane as Kellyann
 Scott Porter as Pastor Seth
 Jonathan Chase as Steve
 Jim Klock as Kyle
 T.C. Carter as Gabe
 Jose Velazquez as Jack
 Tara Parker as Lilith

Production 
Inspiration for "Pure" was taken from the Daughter's Day holiday, which is intended to celebrate daughters and recognize their worth. Hannah Macpherson directed the feature length episode and wrote its teleplay, which was based on a story she came up with alongside Paul Fischer and Paul Davis.

In an interview with Deadline Hollywood, Macpherson noted that she was not aware of the purity ball subculture before Blumhouse Television approached her with the film concept. She wanted the story to "stay far away from any mustache-twirling villains for the fathers" and wanted both the fathers and Pastor Seth to feel realistic and potentially relatable. Macpherson particularly wanted Seth to come across as initially "cool and charismatic and good-natured and passionate about his message". She also considered "Pure" to be a "reverse possession" film due to the character of Shay begging for possession and the power to "punish those who have taken the girls’ power away". Macpherson wanted this to be a discussion point, as she felt that it was "not about religion, although most religions should look at their approach to gender equality, but it's about power and control and oppression."

Jahkara Smith was brought on to portray one of the lead female roles, Shay, starring alongside McKaley Miller, who plays her half-sister Jo.

Release 
"Pure" was released onto Hulu on September 6, 2019. It was intended to coincide with Daughter's Day, which is traditionally held in September.

Themes 
"Pure" deals with themes of purity, female empowerment, and toxic masculinity. Elena Nicolaou of Refinery29 examined the episode's use of the Biblical figure of Lilith, which they noted had become more common in modern day media and looked to "[represent] a different model, another way forward". Nicolaou questioned whether the ending, which portrayed the girls walking into the forest guided by Lilith, was them "returning to the forest, historically the seat of a more feminine power" or a sign that they were "going to war". Macpherson has stated that the ending was meant to have "a ‘wiping the slate’ feeling", further remarking “What if Lilith had never been sent to Hell? What would a power structure where women were treated with the understanding that they can make choices themselves look like?”.

i09 noted that the episode's central thesis was that "Purity events aren’t for celebrating daughters, but for reinforcing traditional gender roles and men’s dominance over their lives." and that this issue "goes beyond faith, control, or systemic sexism. It’s about fighting for the right to be yourself."

Reception
"Pure" holds a rating of 63% on Rotten Tomatoes, based on 8 reviews. Common criticisms centered upon its jump scares, which a reviewer for RogerEbert.com felt weakened what could have been a stronger episode. Elements of praise focused on the acting and the message of female autonomy and toxic masculinity. In a ranking of Into the Dark's episodes, Vulture ranked the episode at 14 and wrote that "What should be one of the most disturbing and powerful chapters of Into the Dark is a failure of execution more than concept."

References

External links
 

Into the Dark (TV series) episodes
2019 American television episodes
Virginity in television
Lilith
Fiction about cults